Laster may refer to:

 Laster (surname)
 Laster (band), a Dutch metal band
 Das Laster, a 1915 German film
 Laster, a Transformer in the 1989 anime series Transformers: Victory